SMB may refer to:

Business
 Small and medium-sized enterprises (SMEs), also known as small and medium-sized businesses (SMBs)

Arts and entertainment
 Sveriges Medeltida Ballader, a compilation of Swedish medieval ballads
 Michigan State University Spartan Marching Band
 Super Mario Bros., a 1985 NES video game
 Super Mario Bros. (disambiguation), other articles related to the NES game
 Super Monkey Ball, a video game series
 Super Monkey Ball (video game), the first game in the series
 Super Meat Boy, a 2010 platform video game
 Super Mega Baseball, a 2014 sports video game

Science
 Society for Mathematical Biology
 Surface mass balance of a glacier or ice sheet

Technology

Electronics and computing
 SMB connector, SubMiniature B connector
 System Management Bus, for computer communication
 Server Message Block (SMB or SMB/CIFS), a network protocol

Other technologies
 Simulated moving bed for chromatographic separation
 Surface marker buoy, to indicate a diver's position
 Survey motor boat, for hydrographic survey

Other uses
 Sekolah Menengah Berakas (Berakas Secondary School), Brunei
 Seven Mile Beach, Grand Cayman
 Shimbashi Station, JR East station code
 San Miguel Beermen (disambiguation), a Philippine basketball teams
Sean Murphy-Bunting